The 1914–15 Indiana Hoosiers men's basketball team represented Indiana University. Their head coach was Arthur Berndt, who was in his 2nd and final year. The team played its home games at the Old Assembly Hall in Bloomington, Indiana, and was a member of the Western Conference.

The Hoosiers finished the regular season with an overall record of 4–9 and a conference record of 1–9, finishing 9th in the Western Conference.

Roster

Schedule/Results

|-
!colspan=8| Regular Season
|-

References

Indiana
Indiana Hoosiers men's basketball seasons
1914 in sports in Indiana
1915 in sports in Indiana